The 1983 SWAC men's basketball tournament was held March 10–12, 1983. The quarterfinal round was held at the home arena of the higher-seeded team, while the semifinal and championship rounds were held at the Mississippi Coliseum in Jackson, Mississippi. Alcorn State defeated , 81–69 in the championship game. The Braves received the conference's automatic bid to the 1983 NCAA tournament as one of two No. 12 seeds in the Midwest Region.

Bracket and results

References

1982–83 Southwestern Athletic Conference men's basketball season
SWAC men's basketball tournament